There are two sets of numbered Metropolitan Routes in Gauteng. See:
Metropolitan Routes in Johannesburg
Metropolitan Routes in Pretoria

Numbered routes in South Africa